The 2020 Rally Argentina (also known as the Speedagro Rally Argentina 2020) was a motor racing event for rally cars that was scheduled to be held over four days between 23 and 26 April 2020, but had to be cancelled due to the COVID-19 pandemic.

Thierry Neuville and Nicolas Gilsoul are the defending rally winners. Their team, Hyundai Shell Mobis WRT, are the manufacturers' winners. Mads Østberg and Torstein Eriksen are the defending winners in the World Rally Championship-2 category. In the World Rally Championship-3 category, Pedro Heller and Marc Martí are the reigning rally winners.

Background

Route
The second leg is revised.

Itinerary
All dates and times are ART (UTC-3).

Notes

References

External links
  
 2020 Rally Argentina at ewrc-results.com
 The official website of the World Rally Championship

2020 in Argentine motorsport
Argentina
2020
Argentina